Brandon Montour (born April 11, 1994) is a Canadian professional ice hockey defenceman for the Florida Panthers in the National Hockey League (NHL). Montour was selected by the Anaheim Ducks in the second round, 55th overall, of the 2014 NHL Entry Draft.

Early life 
Montour is of Mohawk descent and grew up in Ohsweken, a village inside the reserve of Six Nations of the Grand River. Six Nations is known to have the greatest number of people among all First Nations in Canada. His father, Cam Montour, is Indigenous Canadian. In tribute to this, Brandon has an uncompleted tattoo on his left arm that consists of a headdress and feathers.

Montour spent eight years living in Tilbury, Ontario, where he completed his elementary education. He then moved to Ohsweken, Ontario, and attended Assumption College School, in Brantford, Ontario. Montour also grew up playing lacrosse and won a Minto Cup with the Six Nations Arrows.

Montour also played in lacrosse tournaments with Nick Ritchie, a former teammate on the Ducks, as well as Ritchie's brother, Brett Ritchie, who played for NHL's Boston Bruins.

Playing career
Montour started his hockey journey playing minor hockey in Cambridge, Ontario, prior to joining the Brantford Golden Eagles hockey club in 2010–11. Montour then joined the Caledonia Corvairs for one season in 2012–13.

Montour played with the Waterloo Black Hawks of the United States Hockey League (USHL) and one season with the University of Massachusetts Amherst, where he became the highest NHL draft pick in their school program's history. Montour began his professional career at age 21 with the Anaheim Ducks' affiliate, the Norfolk Admirals of the American Hockey League (AHL) towards the end of the 2014–15 season. He would then play the entire 2015–16 season with the Ducks' relocated AHL affiliate, the San Diego Gulls. Montour was selected to the 2017 AHL All-Star game for the second consecutive year. Despite not playing the entire season for the Gulls, Montour had amassed 21 points in only 25 games.

Montour spent the first half of the 2016–17 ice hockey season with San Diego before he was called up to Anaheim on December 28, 2016. He made his NHL debut on December 29 against the Calgary Flames. Montour scored his first NHL goal in his sixth game against Tampa Bay Lightning on February 6, 2017. He finished the season with 4 assists and 2 goals in 27 games, then provided 7 more assists in the next 17 games of the Stanley Cup playoffs. 

Montour stuck with Ducks for the entirety of the 2017–18 season and put up a career-high 32 points in 80 games. At the conclusion of the season, with Montour as a restricted free agent, the Ducks signed him to a two-year contract. 

Montour began the 2018–19 season returning for his third season with the Ducks. Montour led Anaheim defensemen with 25 points through 62 games, however with the Ducks out of a playoff spot approaching the trade deadline, Montour was dealt to the Buffalo Sabres in exchange for Brendan Guhle and a 2019 first-round pick on February 24, 2019.

On April 10, 2021, Montour was traded to the Florida Panthers in exchange for a third-round pick in the 2021 NHL Entry Draft.

International play

On April 29, 2019, Montour was selected to make his international debut after he was named to the Team Canada roster for the 2019 IIHF World Championship, held in Slovakia. On May 13, 2019, during a 6–5 victory over host nation Slovakia, Montour suffered a tournament ending lower body injury, he finished scoreless through 3 games for Canada. He later received the Silver medal as Canada progressed through to the playoff rounds before losing the final to Finland to finish with the Silver Medal on May 26, 2019.

Career statistics

Regular season and playoffs

International

Awards and honours

References

External links

1994 births
Living people
Anaheim Ducks draft picks
Anaheim Ducks players
Buffalo Sabres players
Canadian ice hockey defencemen
First Nations sportspeople
Florida Panthers players
Norfolk Admirals players
San Diego Gulls (AHL) players
UMass Minutemen ice hockey players
Waterloo Black Hawks players